The Essential is the debut and sole greatest hits album released in 1997 by Don Johnson on the Sony Music Media Record Label.

Track listing
 "Tell It Like It Is"
 "Voice on a Hotline"
 "Heartbeat"
 "Other People's Lives"
 "Heartache Away"
 "What if It Takes All Night"
 "Can't Take Your Memory"
 "Angel City"
 "Star Tonight"
 "Lost in Your Eyes"
 "Coco Don't"
 "Gotta Get Away"
 "Your Love Is Safe with Me"
 "Lonely Too Long"
 "Last Sound Love Makes"
 "A Better Place" (Duet with Yuri)

References

External links
Amazon.co.uk album description

Don Johnson albums
1997 greatest hits albums